Dr. Terror's Gallery of Horrors is a low-budget 1967 colour scope anthology film by David L. Hewitt from stories by Russ Jones. The film includes footage from Roger Corman's Edgar Allan Poe adaptations. The similarity of its title to Amicus Productions' hit Dr. Terror's House of Horrors led to numerous enforced title changes, including Return from the Past, The Blood Suckers, Alien Massacre, and most commonly Gallery of Horror (on-screen) and Gallery of Horrors (on packaging).  It has also been released as The Witch's Clock, after the first story, and the only one to feature star John Carradine, who hosts the interstitial segments. It also stars Lon Chaney Jr., Rochelle Hudson, Roger Gentry and Vic McGee.  The other stories include "King Vampire," "Monster Raid," "Spark of Life," and "Count Alucard," which is credited as "Count Dracula."  In the latter story, Jonathan Harker (one of several roles played by Gentry) is revealed, in a humorous twist, to be a werewolf.

Proclaimed by the film's posters as being the 'world's weirdest movie'.

Cast
 Lon Chaney Jr. as Dr. Mendell (as Lon Chaney)
 John Carradine as Narrator / Tristram Halbin
 Rochelle Hudson as Helen Spalding
 Roger Gentry as Bob Farrell / Mob Leader / Dr. Sevard / Jonathan Harker
 Ron Doyle as Brenner / Dr. Charles Spalding / Dr. Cushing
 Karen Joy as Julie Farrell / Vampire (Medina)
 Vic McGee as Dr. Finchley / Desmond / Amos Duncan / The Burgermeister
 Ron Brogan as Marsh
 Margaret Moore as Mrs. O'Shea
 Gray Daniels as The Coachman
 Mitch Evans as The Count (Alucard)
 Joey Benson as Dr. Sedgewick

References

External links

 

1967 films
1960s English-language films
1967 horror films
1960s monster movies
American anthology films
Films directed by David L. Hewitt